Events from the year 1848 in Canada.

Incumbents
Monarch — Victoria

Federal government
Parliament: 3rd

Governors
Governor General of the Province of Canada — Edmund Walker Head
Governor of New Brunswick: William MacBean George Colebrooke
Governor of Nova Scotia: Lucius Cary, 10th Viscount Falkland
Civil Governor of Newfoundland: John Harvey
Governor of Prince Edward Island: Henry Vere Huntley

Premiers
Joint Premiers of the Province of Canada —
William Henry Draper, Canada West Premier
Samuel Harrison, Canada East Premier
Premier of Nova Scotia — James Boyle Uniacke

Events
January 2 – Maple sugar is made in St. Anselme.
January 15 – Wellington and Commissioners streets in Montreal are flooded.
January 27 – Ploughing about Bathurst and Beckwith.
March 4 – The so-called Great Ministry of Robert Baldwin and Louis-Hippolyte Lafontaine begins.
May 15 – MP's vote themselves 50 pounds each for 25 days.
July 5 – Run on the Savings Bank, Montreal, followed by re-deposit.
September 20 – Opening of the Jesuits' College, Montreal.

full date unknown
First telegraph lines in Nova Scotia and New Brunswick.
1848 Newfoundland general election
Responsible government established in Nova Scotia and The Canadas.

Births
January 19 – John Fitzwilliam Stairs, entrepreneur and statesman (died 1904)
February 4 – James Brien, politician and physician (died 1907)
February 24 – Grant Allen, science writer, author and novelist (died 1899)
March 7 – Isidore-Noël Belleau, politician and lawyer (died 1936)
March 24 – Honoré Beaugrand, journalist, politician, author and folklorist (died 1906)
April 14 – James Walker, jurist
April 23 – George Clift King, politician and 2 Mayor of Calgary (died 1935)
May 20 – Joseph-Aldric Ouimet, politician (died 1916)
July 18 – Hugh Graham, 1st Baron Atholstan, newspaper publisher (died 1938)
October 23 – Joseph Tassé, politician (died 1895)
November 24 – William Stevens Fielding, journalist, politician and Premier of Nova Scotia (died 1929)
December 21 – George Boyce, politician (died 1930)

Deaths
February 1 – John Neilson, publisher, printer, bookseller, politician, farmer, and militia officer (born 1776)

References 

 
Canada
48
1848 in North America